Model High School is a public high school in Shannon, Georgia, United States. It serves grades 9–12 in the Floyd County School District.

Shannon is in the school's attendance boundary.

References

External links
Model High School

Schools in Floyd County, Georgia
Public high schools in Georgia (U.S. state)